Parmouti 6 - Coptic Calendar - Parmouti 8

The seventh day of the Coptic month of Parmouti, the eighth month of the Coptic year. In common years, this day corresponds to April 2, of the Julian Calendar, and April 15, of the Gregorian Calendar. This day falls in the Coptic Season of Shemu, the season of the Harvest.

Commemorations

Martyrs 

 The martyrdom of Saints Agapius and Theodora

Saints 

 The departure of Righteous Joachim, the father of the Virgin Saint Mary
 The departure of Saint Macrobius 
 The departure of Saint Metruf

References 

Days of the Coptic calendar